Sports Unlimited (now Sports U) is a Philippine sports docu-news magazine program broadcast by ABS-CBN, hosted by Dyan Castillejo. The program features different kinds of sports, as well as ordinary and prominent sports figures. It is the longest-running sports program in the Philippines and in Asia.
 
Sports Unlimited originally aired on ABS-CBN every Saturday nights right after The Bottomline with Boy Abunda. Replay telecasts also aired on S+A every Sunday at 6:30PM, and on ANC every Sunday at 11:30PM. It also airs worldwide via TFC.

On February 12, 2015, the program is reformatted as Sports U, and originally aired on ABS-CBN's Kapamilya Gold afternoon block. In December 2015, the program moved to late-nights and currently airs every Thursday right after Bandila. ANC and S+A (along with early broadcast from DZMM TeleRadyo) retain their simulcast.

Hosts
Main host
Dyan Castillejo

Former hosts
Vince Hizon
Marc Nelson

Background 
Sports Unlimited is a sports program that was every aired Saturdays on ABS-CBN since 1997.

It is the first sports show of its kind in the country, which combines adventure, sports, and travel, while featuring current sports events, sports features, latest in health and fitness trends, and an up-close on sports personalities and other celebrities.

Sports Unlimited aims to inform Filipinos about what sports are available in the country other than what is normally seen on television like basketball, baseball, golf or boxing. The show seeks to promote adventure tourism, sports and healthy living to Filipino viewers. It also strives to honor athletes when they have achieved success in local and international competition.

Ultimately, its message is to encourage a sporty and active lifestyle especially to the youth.

Awards and recognitions
Winner, Best Sports-Oriented Show - PMPC Star Awards for Television (1999, 2003, 2005 and 2006)
Hall of Fame, 2009 Catholic Mass Media Awards
Best Sports Show, 2005, 2006, 2008 Catholic Mass Media Awards
Winner, Best Sports Program (2008) 6th Gawad Tanglaw
Winner, Best Sports Program (2009) 7th Gawad Tanglaw
Winner, Best Sports Anchors (2010) 8th Gawad Tanglaw (Dyan Castillejo, Marc Nelson, Tommy Manotoc, Jr.)
Winner, Best Sports Program (2010) 19th Golden Dove Award
Winner, Best Sports Program (2011) 9th Gawad Tanglaw
Winner, Best Sports Program (2012) 10th Gawad Tanglaw
Winner, Best Sports Program (2012) 20th Golden Dove Award
Winner, Best Sports Show (2012) 8th USTv Students’ Choice Awards 
Winner, Best Sports Program (2013) 11th Gawad Tanglaw
Winner, Best Sports Program (2013) 21st Golden Dove Award
Winner, Best Sports Program (2014) 10th USTv Students’ Choice Awards 
Winner, Students' Choice of Sports Personality - Dyan Castillejo (2014) 8th USTv Students' Choice Awards
Winner, Best Sports Program (2014) 22nd Golden Dove Award

See also
List of programs broadcast by ABS-CBN

References

External links
Sports Unlimited Website @ ABS-CBN News

ABS-CBN original programming
ABS-CBN News and Current Affairs shows
1997 Philippine television series debuts
2020 Philippine television series endings
English-language television shows
Filipino-language television shows